Liu Qinghua is a retired professional wushu taolu athlete from China. She is commonly regarded as one of the greatest female wushu athletes of all time. She is a two-time world champion and Asian Games gold medalist.

Career 
Liu started training wushu in 1983, and was invited to start training with the Liaoning Wushu Team in 1985 under Pan Qingfu. In 1990, she won the provincial championship and in 1993, she became the world champion in jianshu at the 1993 World Wushu Championships in Kuala Lumpur, Malaysia, winning the first medal for China at the competition. Two years later, she was transferred to the Beijing Wushu Team to train under Wu Bin. In 1997 at the National Games of China in Shanghai, Liu won the gold medal in women's all-around changquan. A year later, she competed in the 1998 Asian Games in women's changquan all-around and won the gold medal. Three years later, Liu was a double medalist at the 2001 National Games of China in Guangdong, winning the gold medal in the changquan compulsory and optional routine combined event and winning the silver medal in the jianshu and qiangshu event. As her last competition, she appeared at the 2001 World Wushu Championships in Yerevan, Armenia, and became the world champion in jianshu once again. In December 2001, Liu announced her retirement and married a Sanda coach. As of May 2021, Liu serves as an executive vice chairman and secretary-general of the Binzhou Municipal Wushu Association.

Awards 

 China Central Television's :  (nominated)

See also 

 List of Asian Games medalists in wushu

References 

Living people
Chinese wushu practitioners
Wushu practitioners at the 1998 Asian Games
Asian Games gold medalists for China
Asian Games medalists in wushu
Medalists at the 1998 Asian Games
1971 births